The 1992 Nigerian Senate election in Kwara State was held on July 4, 1992, to elect members of the Nigerian Senate to represent Kwara State. Idris Gunu Haliru representing Kwara North, Ayinla Olomoda representing Kwara Central and Bisi Oyewo representing Kwara South all won on the platform of the Social Democratic Party.

Overview

Summary

Results

Kwara North 
The election was won by Idris Gunu Haliru of the Social Democratic Party.

Kwara Central 
The election was won by Ayinla Olomoda of the Social Democratic Party.

Kwara South 
The election was won by Bisi Oyewo of the Social Democratic Party.

References 

Kwa
Kwara State Senate elections
July 1992 events in Nigeria